William Miskey Thomas (December 8, 1877 to January 14, 1950), was a Major League Baseball outfielder who played in  with the Philadelphia Phillies.

Thomas was the brother of fellow Major Leaguer, Roy Thomas.

He was born in Norristown, Pennsylvania and died in Evansburg, Pennsylvania.

External links

1877 births
1950 deaths
Baseball players from Pennsylvania
Major League Baseball outfielders
Philadelphia Phillies players
Minor league baseball managers
Milwaukee Brewers (minor league) players
Troy Trojans (minor league) players
Youngstown Ohio Works players
Youngstown Champs players
Harrisburg Senators players
McKeesport Tubers players